Eleutherodactylus lamprotes is a species of frog in the family Eleutherodactylidae endemic to the Massif de la Hotte, Haiti. Its common name is Castillon robber frog. The specific name refers to its contrasting colour patterns.

Description
Males measure  in snout–vent length. Dorsum is patternless brown to tan, whereas concealed surfaces of thighs, underside of hindlimbs, and axillae are bright orange. Vocal sac dark is brown, and venter is dark brown with large white spots. Dorsum is weakly tuberculate, but upper eyelids and upper surface of head have prominent, almost spine-like tubercles.

Habitat and conservation
The species' natural habitat is mesic upland forest at elevations of  asl. It is an arboreal species found in bromeliads. It is moderately common in suitable habitat, but threatened by habitat loss. The species occurs in the Pic Macaya National Park, but there is no active management for conservation, and the habitat loss continues also in the park.

References

lamprotes
Endemic fauna of Haiti
Amphibians of Haiti
Amphibians described in 1973
Taxonomy articles created by Polbot